Paul Billerbeck (4 April 1853 – 23 December 1932) was a Lutheran minister and scholar of Judaism, best known for his Commentary on the New Testament from the Talmud and Midrash (German, 1926) co-written with Hermann Strack. 

Billerbeck was born in Bad Schönfließ, Neumark, Prussia and educated in Greifswald and Leipzig. Billerbeck's participation in Strack's Commentary on the New Testament from the Talmud and Midrash commenced in 1906 when Strack encouraged Billerbeck to compile and expand the material of John Lightfoot, Christian Schoettgen (1733) and Johann Jacob Wetstein for a new German commentary on the New Testament using rabbinical literature.

Works

References

Translations
The Passover Meal, translated by Nathaniel J. Biebert (Red Brick Parsonage, 2013).
Luke 18 and Fasting: Commentary on Luke 18:11b,12a, translated by Nathaniel J. Biebert (Red Brick Parsonage, 2013).
John 10 and Hanukkah: Commentary on John 10:22-30, translated by Nathaniel J. Biebert (Red Brick Parsonage, 2013).
Commentary on Luke 7:36-50, translated by Nathaniel J. Biebert (Red Brick Parsonage, 2013).
Commentary on Matthew 5:13-14, translated by Nathaniel J. Biebert (Red Brick Parsonage, 2014).

German biblical scholars
1853 births
1932 deaths
New Testament scholars
19th-century German Lutheran clergy
People from Gryfino County
People from the Province of Brandenburg
Lutheran biblical scholars
20th-century German Lutheran clergy